Édouard François Zier (1856 – 19 January 1924) was a French illustrator and painter.

Life and works 
Édouard François Zier was born in Paris in 1856. He received his instructions in art from his father  and later became a pupil of the painter Jean-Léon Gérôme.

His first painting, Mort de Caton d'Utique ("Death of Cato"), was exhibited at the Salon of 1874. Charles VI et Odette appeared at the 1880 Salon; these two paintings and also Esther (1883) were purchased by the French State. His Julia (Julie, 1875) on a Roman theme was shown at the 1876 Philadelphia Exposition and was awarded a gold medal.

Zier is known foremost however as an illustrator, for a wide variety of genres.

Two of the adventures of the comic book series Bécassine (1917 and 1918) were illustrated by Zier while the original artist Joseph-Porphyre Pinchon served in World War I.

He died in Thiais on 19 January 1924.

Gallery

References
Citations

Bibliography

External links
 Lambiek Comiclopedia article

19th-century French painters
20th-century French painters
20th-century French male artists
1856 births
1924 deaths
French illustrators
French children's book illustrators
French comics artists
19th-century French male artists